Seminole is an unincorporated community in Baldwin County, Alabama, United States.

In the Top Gear: US Special the town's 'State Line Convenience' was the location of an attack on the main presenters by residents angered by slogans written on their cars.

History
The community is named after the Seminole tribe. A post office operated under the name Seminole from 1894 to 1967.

References

Unincorporated communities in Baldwin County, Alabama
Unincorporated communities in Alabama
Alabama placenames of Native American origin